The Maryland Terrapins baseball team was a baseball team that represented the University of Maryland, College Park in the 2022 NCAA Division I baseball season. The Terrapins were members of the Big Ten Conference and played their home games at Bob "Turtle" Smith Stadium in College Park, Maryland. They were led by fifth-year head coach Rob Vaughn.

Maryland won their first regular season conference title in 51 years, and the Big Ten regular season title for the first time ever.

Previous season
The Terrapins finished the 2021 NCAA Division I baseball season 30–18 overall (28–16 conference) and second place in conference standings, as the season was limited to only conference games for all Big Ten teams due to the COVID-19 pandemic.  Following the conclusion of the regular season, the Terrapins were selected to play in the 2021 NCAA Tournament, beginning in the Greenville Regional. The Terrapins would eventually lose in the second round of the Greenville Regional to East Carolina by a score of 9–6.

Preseason
Pitching coach Corey Muscara left the team to become the pitching coach of the Wake Forest. The Terrapins promoted Anthony Papio from volunteer assistant to full-time assistant. They then hired Mike Morrison to complete their coaching staff.

For the 2022 Big Ten Conference poll, Maryland was voted to finish in fourth by the Big Ten Coaches.

Roster

Schedule

! style="" | Regular Season (44–10)
|- valign="top"

|- align="center" bgcolor="#ccffcc"
| 1 || February 18 || || at  || Baylor Ballpark • Waco, Texas || 4–0 || Dean (1–0) || Thomas (0–1) || None || 1,704 || 1–0 || –
|- align="center" bgcolor="#ccffcc"
| 2 || February 19 || || at Baylor || Baylor Ballpark • Waco, Texas || 9–5 || Ramsey (1–0) || Helton (0–1) || None || 2,138 || 2–0 || –
|- align="center" bgcolor="#ccffcc"
| 3 || February 20 || || at Baylor || Baylor Ballpark • Waco, Texas || 8–4 || Savacool (1–0) || Jackson (0–1) || None || 2,097 || 3–0 || –
|- align="center" bgcolor="#ccffcc"
| 4 || February 23 || 22 ||  || Bob "Turtle" Smith Stadium • College Park, Maryland || 3–2 || Mrotek (1–0) || Leffler (0–1) || None || 1,072 || 4–0 || –
|- align="center" bgcolor="#ccffcc"
| 5 || February 25 || 22 || at Campbell || Jim Perry Stadium • Buies Creek, North Carolina || 4–0 || Dean (2–0) || Harrington (0–1) || Heine (1) || 623 || 5–0 || –
|- align="center" bgcolor="#ccffcc"
| 6 || February 26 || 22 || at Campbell || Jim Perry Stadium • Buies Creek, North Carolina || 3–1 || Ramsey (2–0) || Kuehler (0–2) || Belgrave (1) || 690 || 6–0 || –
|- align="center" bgcolor="#ccffcc"
| 7 || February 26 || 22 || at Campbell || Jim Perry Stadium • Buies Creek, North Carolina || 9–2 || Savacool (2–0) || Beymer (0–1) || None || 690 || 7–0 || –
|-

|- align="center" bgcolor="#ccffcc"
| 8 || March 1 || 21 ||  || Bob "Turtle" Smith Stadium • College Park, Maryland || 14–4 || Glock (1–0) || Velazquez (0–1) || None || 842 || 8–0 || –
|- align="center" bgcolor="#ffcccc"
| 9 || March 4 || 21 || vs Michigan || Clark–LeClair Stadium • Greenville, North Carolina || 4–7 || Rennard (1–0) || Heine (0–1) || Weiss (2) || – || 8–1 || –
|- align="center" bgcolor="#ccffcc"
| 10 || March 5 || 21 || vs  || Clark–LeClair Stadium • Greenville, North Carolina || 12–6 || Ramsey (3–0) || Parisi (1–2) || Van Buren (1) || – || 9–1 || –
|- align="center" bgcolor="#ffcccc"
| 11 || March 6 || 21 || at East Carolina || Clark–LeClair Stadium • Greenville, North Carolina || 3–6 || Beal (1–0) || Savacool (2–1) || Giles (1) || 3,863 || 9–2 || –
|- align="center" bgcolor="#ccffcc"
| 12 || March 8 || 24 || VCU || Bob "Turtle" Smith Stadium • College Park, Maryland || 8–6 || Orlando (1–0) || Serrano (0–1) || Glock (1) || 627 || 10–2 || –
|- align="center" bgcolor="#bbbbbb"
| – || March 9 || 24 || at VCU || The Diamond • Richmond, Virginia ||colspan=12| Game cancelled 
|- align="center" bgcolor="#ccffcc"
| 13 || March 11 || 24 ||  || Bob "Turtle" Smith Stadium • College Park, Maryland || 10–9 || Lorusso (1–0) || Tonas (0–1) || None || 1,208 || 11–2 || –
|- align="center" bgcolor="#ccffcc"
| 14 || March 13 || 24 ||  || Bob "Turtle" Smith Stadium • College Park, Maryland || 12–5 || Ramsey (4–0) || Edwards (1–2) || None || 425 || 12–2 || –
|- align="center" bgcolor="#ccffcc"
| 15 || March 14 || 24 || at Georgetown || Shirley Povich Field • Washington, D.C. || 5–1 || Savacool (3–1) || Salley (2–1) || None || 753 || 13–3 || –
|- align="center" bgcolor="#ffcccc"
| 16 || March 15 || 24 || at Delaware || Bob Hannah Stadium • Newark, Delaware || 3–6 || Pizzico (1–0) || Lorusso (1–1) || Biasiello (2) || 254 || 13–3 || –
|- align="center" bgcolor="#ccffcc"
| 17 || March 19 || 24 ||  || Bob "Turtle" Smith Stadium • College Park, Maryland || 14–9 || Heine (1–1) || Marynczak (0–1) || None || 1,091 || 14–3 || –
|- align="center" bgcolor="#ccffcc"
| 18 || March 19 || 24 || Siena || Bob "Turtle" Smith Stadium • College Park, Maryland || 7–0 || Ramsey (5–0) || Seiler (1–3) || None ||1,091 || 15–3 || –
|- align="center" bgcolor="#ccffcc"
| 19 || March 20 || 24 || Siena || Bob "Turtle" Smith Stadium • College Park, Maryland || 19–2 || Savacool (4–1) || Rozakis (0–2) || None || 618 || 16–3 || –
|- align="center" bgcolor="#ccffcc"
| 20 || March 22 || 22 || at UMBC || The Baseball Factory Field at UMBC • Catonsville, Maryland || 13–7 || Van Buren (1–0) || Gorman (0–1) || None || 387 || 17–3 || –
|- align="center" bgcolor="#ffcccc"
| 21 || March 25 || 22 || at  || Horner Ballpark • Dallas, Texas || 3–8 || Meador (5–0) || Dean (2–1) || None || 1,378 || 17–4 || –
|- align="center" bgcolor="#ccffcc"
| 22 || March 26 || 22 || at Dallas Baptist || Horner Ballpark • Dallas, Texas || 11–5 || Ramsey (6–0) || Eldred (3–1) || None || 863 || 18–4 || –
|- align="center" bgcolor="#ffcccc"
| 23 || March 27 || 22 || at Dallas Baptist || Horner Ballpark • Dallas, Texas || 2–5 || Hall (2–1) || Savacool (4–2) || Arnold (4) || 1,050 || 18–5 || –
|- align="center" bgcolor="#ccffcc"
| 24 || March 29 ||  ||  || Bob "Turtle" Smith Stadium • College Park, Maryland || 26–8 || Johnson (1–0) || Pecko (0–1) || None || 543 || 19–5 || –
|- align="center" bgcolor="#ccffcc"
| 25 || March 30 || || at George Mason || Spuhler Field • Fairfax, Virginia || 3–1 || Ott (1–0) || Yount (0–3) || Heine (2) || 115 || 20–5 || –
|-

|- align="center" bgcolor="#ccffcc"
| 26 || April 1 || ||  || Bob "Turtle" Smith Stadium • College Park, Maryland || 8–4 || Mrotek (2–0) || Mellott (1–3) || None || 1,029 || 21–5 || 1–0
|- align="center" bgcolor="#ffcccc"
| 27 || April 2 || || Penn State || Bob "Turtle" Smith Stadium • College Park, Maryland || 4–6 || Luensmann (1–2) || Robinson (0–1) || None || 1,807 || 21–6 || 1–1
|- align="center" bgcolor="#ccffcc"
| 28 || April 3 || || Penn State || Bob "Turtle" Smith Stadium • College Park, Maryland || 7–2 || Savacool (5–2) || Molsky (0–4) || None || 1,308 || 22–6 || 2–1
|- align="center" bgcolor="#ccffcc"
| 29 || April 5 || || George Mason || Bob "Turtle" Smith Stadium • College Park, Maryland || 8–5 || Van Buren (2–0) || Barrett (0–2) || Heine (3) || 389 || 23–6 || 2–1
|- align="center" bgcolor="#ccffcc"
| 30 || April 8 || || at  || Siebert Field • Minneapolis, Minnesota || 11–7 || Dean (3–1) || Ireland (3–2) || None || 219 || 24–6 || 3–1
|- align="center" bgcolor="#ccffcc"
| 31 || April 9 || || at Minnesota || Siebert Field • Minneapolis, Minnesota || 5–4 || Ramsey (7–0) || Massey (2–4) || Falco (1) || 719 || 25–6 || 4–1
|- align="center" bgcolor="#ffcccc"
| 32 || April 10 || || at Minnesota || Siebert Field • Minneapolis, Minnesota || 3–4 || DeLuga (1–0) || Van Buren (2–1) || Skoro (1) || 387 || 25–7 || 4–2
|- align="center" bgcolor="#ccffcc"
| 33 || April 13 || || at  || Eagle Field at Veterans Memorial Park • Harrisonburg, Virginia || 8–7 || Falco (1–0) || Vogatsky (2–4) || None || 774 || 26–7 || 4–2
|- align="center" bgcolor="#ccffcc"
| 34 || April 15 || ||  || Bob "Turtle" Smith Stadium • College Park, Maryland || 8–6 || Falco (2–0) || Hammerberg (2–3) || None || 1,254 || 27–7 || 5–2
|- align="center" bgcolor="#ccffcc"
| 35 || April 16 || || Ohio State || Bob "Turtle" Smith Stadium • College Park, Maryland || 6–5 || Belgrave (1–0) || Loncar (1–4) || None || 1,461 || 28–7 || 6–2
|- align="center" bgcolor="#ccffcc"
| 36 || April 17 || || Ohio State || Bob "Turtle" Smith Stadium • College Park, Maryland || 16–1 || Savacool (6–2) || Gehring (0–2) || None || 1,081 || 29–7 || 7–2
|- align="center" bgcolor="#ccffcc"
| 37 || April 19 || 24 || at Towson || John B. Schuerholz Baseball Complex • Towson, Maryland || 4–3 || Falco (3–0) || Marose (1–1) || None || 184 || 30–7 || 7–2
|- align="center" bgcolor="#ffcccc"
| 38 || April 22 || 24 || at  || Illinois Field • Champaign, Illinois || 1–19 || Kirschsieper (5–2) || Dean (3–2) || None || 737 || 30–8 || 7–3
|- align="center" bgcolor="#ccffcc"
| 39 || April 23 || 24 || at Illinois || Illinois Field • Champaign, Illinois || 13–9 || Falco (4–0) || Green (1–2) || None || 495 || 31–8 || 8–3
|- align="center" bgcolor="#ccffcc"
| 40 || April 23 || 24 || at Illinois || Illinois Field • Champaign, Illinois|| 7–4 || Savacool (7–2) || Gowens (4–2) || Belgrave (2) || 1,042 || 32–8 || 9–3
|- align="center" bgcolor="#ccffcc"
| 41 || April 26 || 23 ||  || Bob "Turtle" Smith Stadium • College Park, Maryland || 18–10 || Heine (2–1) || Smith (1–1) || None || 512 || 33–8 || 9–3
|- align="center" bgcolor="#ccffcc"
| 42 || April 29 || 23 || Northwestern || Bob "Turtle" Smith Stadium • College Park, Maryland || 13–0 || Ramsey (8–0) || Sullivan (5–1) || None || 1,270 || 34–8 || 10–3
|- align="center" bgcolor="#ffcccc"
| 43 || April 30 || 23 || Northwestern || Bob "Turtle" Smith Stadium • College Park, Maryland || 4–7 || Moe (3–3) || Falco (4–1) || Doherty (1) || 2,576 || 34–9 || 10–4
|-

|- align="center" bgcolor="#ccffcc"
| 44 || May 1 || 23 || Northwestern || Bob "Turtle" Smith Stadium • College Park, Maryland || 10–5 || Falco (5–1) || Hanks (2–1) || None || 568 || 35–9 || 11–4
|- align="center" bgcolor="#ccffcc"
| 45 || May 3 || 18 || Georgetown || Bob "Turtle" Smith Stadium • College Park, Maryland || 19–1 || Mrotek (3–0) || Keough (2–1) || None || 831 || 36–9 || 11–4
|- align="center" bgcolor="#ccffcc"
| 46 || May 8 || 18 || at  || Bainton Field • Piscataway, New Jersey || 16–8 || Ramsey (9–0) || Kollar (7–2) || None || 678 || 37–9 || 12–4
|- align="center" bgcolor="#ffcccc"
| 47 || May 8 || 18 || at Rutgers || Bainton Field • Piscataway, New Jersey || 7–18 || Gorski (5–0) || Mrotek (3–1) || None || 678 || 37–10 || 12–5
|- align="center" bgcolor="#ccffcc"
| 48 || May 9 || 22 || at Rutgers || Bainton Field • Piscataway, New Jersey || 9–4 || Dean (4–2) || Bello (4–1) || Falco (2) || 651 || 38–10 || 13–5
|- align="center" bgcolor="#ccffcc"
| 49 || May 13 || 18 || Michigan || Bob "Turtle" Smith Stadium • College Park, Maryland || 8–7 || Falco (6–1) || O'Halloran (4–4) || Belgrave (3) || 1,478 || 39–10 || 14–5
|- align="center" bgcolor="#ccffcc"
| 50 || May 14 || 18 || Michigan || Bob "Turtle" Smith Stadium • College Park, Maryland || 20–6 || Ramsey (10–0) || Denner (3–6) || None || 1,478 || 40–10 || 15–5
|- align="center" bgcolor="#ccffcc"
| 51 || May 15 || 18 || Michigan || Bob "Turtle" Smith Stadium • College Park, Maryland || 15–10 || Dean (5–2) || Allen (6–1) || None || 2,075 || 41–10 || 16–5
|- align="center" bgcolor="#ccffcc"
| 52 || May 17 || 15 || James Madison || Bob "Turtle" Smith Stadium • College Park, Maryland || 12-2 || Ott (2-0) || Czerwinski (1-1) || None || 1,272 || 42-10 || 16-5
|- align="center" bgcolor="#ccffcc"
| 53 || May 19 || 15 || at Purdue || Alexander Field • West Lafayette, Indiana || 14–7 || Savacool (8–2) || Backer (2–2) || None || 1,690 || 43–10 || 17–5
|- align="center" bgcolor="#ccffcc"
| 54 || May 20 || 15 || at Purdue || Alexander Field • West Lafayette, Indiana || 18–7 || Dean (5–2) || Stephen (3–4) || None || 1,420 || 44–10 || 18–5
|- align="center" bgcolor="#bbbbbb"
| – || May 21 || 15 || at Purdue || Alexander Field • West Lafayette, Indiana ||colspan=12| Game cancelled 

|-
! style="" | Postseason
|- valign="top" 

|- align="center" bgcolor="#ccffcc"
| 55 || May 26 || 10 || vs Indiana || Charles Schwab Field Omaha • Omaha, Nebraska || 6–5 || Belgrave (2–0) || Perkins (3–3) || None || – || 45–10 || 18–5
|- align="center" bgcolor="#ffcccc"
| 56 || May 27 || 10 || vs Michigan || Charles Schwab Field Omaha • Omaha, Nebraska || 4–5 || Weiss (3–2) || Ramsey (10–1) || None || – || 45–11 || 18–5
|- align="center" bgcolor= "#ffcccc"
| 57 || May 28 || 10 || vs Indiana || Charles Schwab Field Omaha • Omaha, Nebraska || 4–6 || Tucker (2–3) || Walsh (0–1) || None || – || 45–12 || 18–5
|-

|- align="center" bgcolor="#ccffcc"
| 58 || June 3 || 12 ||  || Bob "Turtle" Smith Stadium • College Park, Maryland || 6–5 || Ramsey (11–1) || Loeschorn (11–3) || None || 3,000 || 46–12 || 18–5
|- align="center" bgcolor="#ffcccc"
| 59 || June 4 || 12 || UConn || Bob "Turtle" Smith Stadium • College Park, Maryland || 5–10 || Gallagher (10–3) || Savacool (8–3) || Willis (14) || 3,000 || 46–13 || 18–5
|- align="center" bgcolor= "#ccffcc"
| 60 || June 5 || 12 ||  || Bob "Turtle" Smith Stadium • College Park, Maryland || 10–5 || Falco (7–1) || Golob (4–1) || None || 2,179 || 47–13 || 18–5
|- align="center" bgcolor= "#ccffcc"
| 61 || June 5 || 12 || UConn || Bob "Turtle" Smith Stadium • College Park, Maryland || 7–6 || Johnson (2–0) || Golob (4–1) || None || 2,568 || 48–13 || 18–5
|- align="center" bgcolor= "#ffcccc"
| 62 || June 6 || 12 || UConn || Bob "Turtle" Smith Stadium • College Park, Maryland || 8–11 || Peterson (11–2) || Johnson (2–1) || Willis (15) || 3,000 || 48–14 || 18–5
|-

Rankings

Awards

Big Ten Conference Players of the Week

Conference awards

References

Maryland
Maryland Terrapins baseball seasons
Maryland
Big Ten Conference baseball champion seasons
Maryland